The 2019 Dwars door Vlaanderen is a road cycling one-day race that took place on 3 April 2019 in Belgium. It was the 74th edition of Dwars door Vlaanderen and the 13th event of the 2019 UCI World Tour. The race was won by Mathieu van der Poel.

Result

References

Dwars door Vlaanderen
Dwars door Vlaanderen
Dwars door Vlaanderen
Dwars door Vlaanderen